Bell Mountain is a desert mountain, with summit and elevation of , in the Mojave Desert of Southern California.

It is located north of Apple Valley, in San Bernardino County.

References 

Mountains of San Bernardino County, California
Natural history of the Mojave Desert
Mountains of Southern California